Ran Dian is a Hong Kong-based, international contemporary art magazine, published bilingually in English and Mandarin. It aims both to promote independent cultural debate in China and to foster intellectual exchange between China and the rest of the world. It focuses on independent commentary on international art, artists, exhibitions and galleries.

Ran Dian was launched in Shanghai, China in 2010 by Chris Moore, Daniel Szehin Ho and Rebecca Catching. According to Chris Moore, the magazine's international growth was driven by rising interest in East Asia on the part of the Western European art world.

Editorial staff
Dr Liang Shuhan, Editor-in-Chief
Daniel Szehin Ho, Editor-at-Large
Rebecca Catching, Managing Editor
Thomas Eller, President
Robin Peckham, Contributing Editor
David Elliott, Contributing Editor

References

External links
 Ran Dian official website

Magazines published in Hong Kong
English-language magazines
Chinese contemporary art
Contemporary art magazines
Magazines established in 2012